Trechalea gertschi, the long-legged water spider, is a species of true spider in the family Trechaleidae. It is found in the United States and Mexico.

References

Trechaleidae
Articles created by Qbugbot
Spiders described in 1981